Dichostates camerunensis is a species of beetle in the family Cerambycidae. It was described by Breuning in 1954. It is known from Cameroon.

References

Endemic fauna of Cameroon
Crossotini
Beetles described in 1954